Robbie or Robby is a given name and surname.

It may refer also to:
"Robbie" (short story), by Isaac Asimov
Robbie (TV series)
Robbie (film), a series of railway safety films for UK schools
Robby (film), a 1968 retelling of Robinson Crusoe
Robbie International Soccer Tournament, an annual sporting event in Birchmount Stadium, Toronto, Canada